Kim Kum-sok (born 19 August 1987) is a North Korean weightlifter, representing the Amnokgang Sports Team. He competed for North Korea at the 2012 Summer Olympics in the 69 kg weight division.

References

External links

North Korean male weightlifters
Weightlifters at the 2012 Summer Olympics
Olympic weightlifters of North Korea
1987 births
Living people
Asian Games medalists in weightlifting
Weightlifters at the 2006 Asian Games
Weightlifters at the 2010 Asian Games
Asian Games gold medalists for North Korea
Medalists at the 2010 Asian Games
21st-century North Korean people